Portland Park may refer to:

Portland Park, Ashington, a defunct football ground in Ashington, England
Portland Park, Galston, a defunct football ground in Galston, Scotland
Portland Park, Troon, a football ground in Troon, Scotland; home of Troon F.C.